This is a list of electoral results for the Spence in South Australian elections.

Members for Spence

Election results

Elections in the 1990s

Elections in the 1980s

Elections in the 1970s

References

South Australian state electoral results by district